Betty Warfel (May 15, 1928 – September 23, 1990) was a pitcher and utility infielder who played in the All-American Girls Professional Baseball League between the 1948 and 1949 seasons. She was born in Enola, Pennsylvania.

Betty Warfel was a highly versatile player for the Rockford Peaches during her two years in the league, helping her team win the championship title in each of these seasons. She served as a reliever and spot starter, while also being able to play at second base, third base and shortstop when she was not pitching.

Following her baseball days, Warfel worked at Westinghouse Electric Company for 33 years. After retiring, she became an avid bowler and enjoyed outdoors.

Since 1988 she is part of Women in Baseball, a permanent display based at the Baseball Hall of Fame and Museum in Cooperstown, New York, which was unveiled to honor the entire AAGPBL rather than individual baseball personalities.

Career statistics
Batting 

Pitching

Fielding

Sources

All-American Girls Professional Baseball League players
Baseball players from Pennsylvania
People from Cumberland County, Pennsylvania
1928 births
1990 deaths
20th-century American women
20th-century American people